Kostrzewa is a surname. It is derived from the Polish word kostrzewa ("fescue").

Notable people with the surname include:

 Andrzej Kostrzewa (born 1958), Polish fencer
 Dorothy Kostrzewa (1928–2013), Canadian politician
 Klara Sierońska-Kostrzewa (1913–1990), Polish gymnast
 Maciej Kostrzewa (born 1991), Polish footballer
 Marek Kostrzewa (born 1957), Polish footballer
 Ute Kostrzewa (born 1961), German volleyball player
 Wera Kostrzewa, pseudonym of Maria Koszutska (1876–1939), Polish politician
 Wojciech Kostrzewa (born 1960), Polish entrepreneur
 Zdzisław Kostrzewa (1955–1991), Polish footballer

See also

References

Polish-language surnames